Jacques Duquesne (born 22 April 1940 in Marcinelle) is a retired Belgian football goalkeeper.

During his career he played for Olympic Charleroi. He participated in the 1970 FIFA World Cup for the Belgium national football team, but did not earn any senior caps in his career.

References
 Royal Belgian Football Association: Number of caps
 

1940 births
Living people
Footballers from Hainaut (province)
Belgian footballers
Association football goalkeepers
1970 FIFA World Cup players
R. Olympic Charleroi Châtelet Farciennes players
Belgian Pro League players
K.A.A. Gent players